Lebanese Shia Muslims, historically known as matāwila (plural of  mutawālin ([Lebanese pronounced as  metouali]) refers to Lebanese people who are adherents of the Shia branch of Islam in Lebanon, which plays a major role along Lebanon's main Sunni, Maronite and Druze sects. According to the CIA World Factbook, Shia Muslims constituted an estimated 31% of Lebanon's population in 2022.

Most of its adherents live in the northern and western area of the Beqaa Valley, Southern Lebanon and Beirut. The great majority of Shia Muslims in Lebanon are Twelvers. However, a small minority of them are Alawites and Ismaili.

Under the terms of an unwritten agreement known as the National Pact between the various political and religious leaders of Lebanon, Shias are the only sect eligible for the post of Speaker of Parliament.

History

Origins
The cultural and linguistic heritage of the Lebanese people is a blend of both indigenous  elements and the foreign cultures that have come to rule the land and its people over the course of thousands of years. In a 2013 interview the lead investigator, Pierre Zalloua, pointed out that genetic variation preceded religious variation and divisions: "Lebanon already had well-differentiated communities with their own genetic peculiarities, but not significant differences, and religions came as layers of paint on top. There is no distinct pattern that shows that one community carries significantly more Phoenician than another."

Lebanon throughout its history was home of many historic peoples who inhabited the region. The Lebanese coast was mainly inhabited by Phoenician Canaanites throughout the Bronze and Iron ages, who built the cities of Tyre, Sidon, Byblos and Tripoli, which was founded as a center of a confederation between Aradians, Sidonians, and Tyrians. Further east, the Bekaa valley was known as Amqu in the Bronze Age, and was part of Amorite kingdom of Qatna and later Amurru kingdom, and had local city-states such as Enišasi. During the Iron Age, the Bekaa was dominated by the Aramaeans, who formed kingdoms nearby in Damascus and Hamath, and established the kingdom of Aram-Zobah where Hazael might have been born, and was later also settled by Itureans, who were likely Arabs themselves. These Itureans inhabited the hills above Tyre in Southern Lebanon, historically known as Jabal Amel, since at least the times of Alexander the Great, who fought them after they blocked his army's access to wood supply.

During Roman rule, Aramaic became the lingua franca of the entire Levant and Lebanon, replacing spoken Phoenician on the coast, while Greek was used as language of administration, education and trading. It is important to note that most villages and towns in Lebanon today have Aramaic names, reflecting this heritage. However, Beirut became the only fully Latin speaking city in the whole east. On the coast, Tyre prospered under the Romans and was allowed to keep much of its independence as a "civitas foederata". On the other hand, Jabal Amel was inhabited by Banu Amilah, its namesake, who have particular importance for the Lebanese Shia for adopting and nurturing Shi'ism in the southern population. The Banu Amilah were part of the Nabataean Arab foederati of the Roman Empire, and they were connected to other pre-Islamic Arabs such as Judham and Balqayn, whose presence in the region likely dates back to Biblical times according to Irfan Shahîd. As the Muslim conquest of the Levant reached Lebanon, these Arab tribes received the most power which encouraged the non-Arabic-speaking population to adopt Arabic as the main language.

Early Islamic period

The spread of Shia Islam in Lebanon and the Levant is considered to have been a complex, multi-layered process. According to Islamic historian Ja'far al-Muhajir, pro-Alid tribes such as Hamdan and Madh'hij likely settled the region following the Hasan–Muawiya treaty in 661, which facilitated Shi'ism among segments of the local populations in Jabal Amel, Galilee and Beqaa valley. Anti-Abbasid sentiment was common in these areas due to their marginalization of by the Abbasids. According to Husayn Mroue, Shiism was one option among many for the communities of Jabal Amel, but for them, a positive and inviting dialectical relationship between the theological construct of Imamism and its social milieu gave precedence to the Shiite possibility. The transformation likely followed the demise of the Umayyads in 750, when the Emesene Shia poet Abd al-Salam al-Homsi (777–850 CE) figures. The deep crisis of the Abbasid dynasty during the decade-long Anarchy at Samarra (c. 861–870), the rise of breakaway and autonomous regimes in the provinces, the large-scale Zanj Rebellion (c. 869–883), the establishment of Qarmatian Isma'ilis in 899 in Syria, and the rise of the Twelver Shiite Hamdanids in northern Syria in 930 who transformed Aleppo into a Shia hub, all acted catalysts for the further spread of Shia Islam.

According to Al-Maqdisi (c. 966–985), half of Hunin and Qadas inhabitants were Shia Muslims, and Shiites were the majority in Amman and Tiberias adjacent to Jabal Amel. Tiberias was visited in 880s by al-Ya'qubi who noted the presence of a Shia tribe in the city, al-Ash'ari of Madh'hij who originally founded the Shia holy city of Qom in 703. Muhammad ibn Tughj al-Ikhshid killed one of the city's Alid notables in 903 for alleged Qarmatian Ismaili Shia sympathies.

Nasir Khusraw, who visited the Lebanese coast c. 1045–7, notes Tyre and Tripoli being mostly inhabited by Shia Muslims with a population of 20,000 each, and the two cities were uniquely surrounded by dedicated Shia shrines on the outskirts, indicative of their Shiite population. When the Fatimids conquered the region in 970, they quarrelled with the local Shiites. In 996–998, rebels in Tyre drove out the Fatimids for two years until the revolt was suppressed and the dissidents crushed. The Twelver Shia Salih ibn Mirdas rose against the Fatimids in a similar manner, and by 1025 managed to conquer most of Syria, western Iraq and parts of Lebanon. Between 1070–1109, Tripoli experienced a brief period of independence under the Shia Banu Ammar dynasty, a family of Shia qadis who captured Jableh from the Byzantines and ruled a territory as far as Jbeil in the south. Tripoli's second qadi Jalal al-Mulk invested large sums in turning the city a famous center for learning, founding a "House of Knowledge" that attracted scholars, as well as a notable library of reportedly 100,000 volumes.

Further east in the Bekaa valley, sources are scarce and generally uninformative. According to al-Muhajir, Yaman-affiliated tribes which lived in the surroundings of Baalbek before 872, such as Banu Kalb and Banu Hamdan were supportive of Alid sentiments at the time, and they likely played a role in disseminating Shia Islam in the Bekaa and anti-Lebanon mountains. Qarmatian influence may have also played a role when the latter gained foothold in neighboring Homs before the Abbasids kicked them out in 903. The area also witnessed an Alid uprising by a certain "Ibn al-Rida", a descendant of tenth Imam Ali al-Hadi, who rebelled against the Abbasid governor of Damascus in 912. According to al-Muhajir, this Shiite presence in the Bekaa was later reinforced by migrants from Mount Lebanon following the Mamluk and Ottoman campaigns against Shiites in the 14th and 17th centuries respectively, as well as migrants from the Shia villages in Anti-Lebanon Mountains, where the Harfush dynasty originated from.

Late period
With the arrival of the First Crusade, Tripoli and Tyre experienced a drastic upheaval with the crusader conquests. Many Shiites were killed or departed for the interior, who were replaced by tens of thousands of Franks through several decades.
The years-long siege of Tripoli and the brutal aftermath of its fall caused an influx outside of Tripoli. Such influx either inaugurated the Shia community of Keserwan or inflated a previously established rural Shiite community there. According to al-Muhajir, a similar thing happened in Jabal Amel which received a population influx from the Shia-populated urban centers at the time, most notably Tyre and Tiberias and their surrounding countryside. Shias in the Bekaa valley remained under Muslim rule and were on good terms with Bahramshah (1182–1230), who welcomed a prominent Shia scholar from Homs in the city in 1210s, a gesture that "gave morale to the Shiites living in the nahiyah (of Baalbek)".

Most of Jabal Amel regained its autonomy under Husam ad-Din Bechara, a presumably local Shiite officer of Saladin who participated in the capture of Jabal Amel and became its lord from 1187 until 1200. During that time, Husam ad-Din ruled over Toron, Banias and Chastel Neuf, giving him control of the road from Damascus to Tyre road which were of utmost importance in blocking any Frankish attempt at reconquest. Husam ad-Din also participated in the Battle of Hattin and was one of the commanders of Saladin's right flank during the Siege of Acre in 1189–1191, according to Imad ad-Din al-Isfahani. Though little is known about Husam ad-Din's life, he was apparently a close friend of Saladin's son Al-Afdal who later converted to Shia Islam.

Between 1187 and 1291, the Shiites of Jabal Amel were divided between the newly autonomous hills and a coast still subject to the Franks. Shias from the newly autonomous areas of Jabal Amel soon became essential participants in blocking Frankish raids and sieges. During Saladin's siege of Beaufort castle, military units from Jabal Amel, likely those of Husam ad-Din Bishara, came to his aid and replaced his forces as he marched to repel a crusader invasion of Acre. Once again in 1195, Husam ad-Din and his forces fought off a Frankish siege at Toron. In 1217, an elite Hungarian contingent was virtually annihilated by local archers in Jezzine, a Shia locality at the time, and the prisoners were paraded in Damascus.

When the Mongols seized Baalbek, Najm ad-Din ibn Malli al-Baalbeki (b. 1221), one of Baalbek's few Shia scholars at the time, took the initiative and retreated to the slopes of Mount Lebanon, where he was joined by ten thousand guerillas according to 13th century historian al-Yunini. Najm ad-Din and his guerillas reportedly kidnapped and ambushed Mongols at night, and would often adopt pseudonyms to conceal their identities. For example, Najm ad-Din adopted the pseudonym "the bald king".

Mamluk Period and 1305 campaign

By the early 14th century, Jabal Amel was becoming the Twelver Shia center of the Levant. With Shiism losing ground in Aleppo due to previous Seljuq, Ayyubid and now Mamluk takeover, a stream of scholars shifted to Jabal Amel, and the area probably received migrants from there as it provided refuge from Sunni rigor.

In Muharram 1305, the Mamluk army under the command of Aqqush al-Afram devastated the mountain-dwelling Shia community of Keserwan. The Mamluks had previously attempted to subjugate the community through several unsuccessful military campaigns in the 1290s, and launched the last campaign after a band of Keserwanis attacked their retreating army after the Battle of Wadi al-Khaznadar. Aqqush's army of 50,000 advanced and encircled Keserwan from four sides, and was confronted by an estimated 4,000 infantrymen on the Shiites' behalf. The region fell after 11 days of brutal fighting, driving an influx of Shiites toward the Beqaa valley and Jezzine, while a humbled minority stayed. In 1363, the Mamluks released an official decree prohibiting Shia rituals practiced among "some of the people of Beirut, Sidon and their surrounding villages", threatening punishment and military campaign. The Mamluks punished the town of Machghara in 1364 for disobedience and religious dissidence. In 1384, the Mamluks also executed Muhammad Jamaluddin al-Makki al-Amili, the head of the community at the time and most prominent scholar, after falsely charging him of being a ghulat and promoting Nusayri doctrines.

From 1385, much of Jabal Amel and Safed was ruled by the Shia Bechara family, the descendants of Husam ad-Din Bechara. The family ruled most of Safed, Jabal Amel and occasionally Wadi al-Taym. Members of the family also served as supervisors of the Mamuk army in Damascus. In the Bekaa, the illustrious Murtada family of Sayyid descent served as deputies of Baalbek throughout most of the period, and were named supervisors of the newly endowed Alid shrine of Sayyidah Zaynab near Damascus in 1366.
They seem to have been replaced by the Harfush dynasty as deputies of Baalbek later by 1498. The Harfushes were first identified by late-Mamluk historian Ibn Tawq as muqaddams of the Anti-Lebanon mountain villages al-Jebbeh and Assal al-Ward as early as 1483, and later as deputies of Baalbek in 1498 by historians Ibn Homsi and Ibn Tulun. When civil strife and siege ignited between Mamluk governors in Damascus in 1497,
Two Shia muqaddams, Ibn Bechara and Ibn Harfush, reportedly fought on each other's side. According to contemporary chronicler Ibn Tulun, many Shiites had come to join the battle. In Mount Lebanon, the Hamada family were among the earliest identified Shia families, reportedly serving as tax-collectors in the district of Mamluk Tripoli as early as 1471, in the region Dinniyeh. Bilad Beirut were similarly under the jurisdiction of a Shia muqaddam prior to 1407.

Under Ottoman rule
The Levant fell to the Ottomans in 1516, bringing about a new period in the region. Under the Ottomans, Local Shias often came into conflict with Ottoman-assigned governors of Tripoli, Sidon and Damascus, who derogatorily referred to them as Qizilbash in their documents as a means to delegitimize them or justify punitive campaigns against them. During most of the Ottoman period, the Shia largely maintained themselves as 'a state apart'. Unlike the Druze, the Shiite emirs were regularly denounced for their religious identity and persecuted as Qizilbash heretics per Ebussuud Efendi's definitions. Ebussuud's fatwās labeled the Qizilbash, regardless of whether they lived on Iranian or Ottoman soil, as "heretics", and declared that killing them would be viewed as praiseworthy. 
Furthermore, unlike Christians whose affairs were run by the millet system and were recognized as religious communities (e.g. Maronites, Rum Christians, Protestant Christians etc.), the Shiites were not recognized as a community nor as a distinct religious sect by the Ottomans. The 18th century French orientalist comte de Volney who visited Lebanon toward the late 1780s described Lebanese Shiites as a "distinct society", and a 19th century British traveler observed that they were hated by Persians as Arabs, and by Turks and Arabs as Shiites, a predicament which was not shared by any other group.

However, the Ottomans did confirm tax-collectorship iltizam to the local Shia in Jabal Amel, Bekaa valley and northern Mount Lebanon as part of their efforts of relying on local intermediaries rather than forcibly imposing foreign ones. The Harfush and Hamade families received iltizam over the Bekaa valley and northern Mount Lebanon respectively, while Jabal Amel consisted of several nawahi governed by multiple families, until Ali al-Saghirs seized most of Jabal Amel by 1649.
These feudal families frequently quarrelled with the Ottoman governors to maintain autonomy over their territories. Comte de Volney, who visited Lebanon between 1783 and 1785, indeed noted this.
"The Metoualis are almost annihilated due to their revolts; their name is soon to be extinct".

Bekaa valley
Despite signing a letter offering submission to Selim I in 1516, the Harfushes' initial relationship with their new masters seems to have been problematic when the governor of Syria, Janbirdi al-Ghazali, executed Shia chief Ibn Harfush as a rebel in 1518, contemporarily evicting them from the deputyship of Baalbek. At their high-point, Harfush domains extended from the Beqaa valley into Palmyra far in the Syrian Desert and sanjak of Homs in 1592 under Musa Harfush, and the family also obtained a rank in the provincial military hierarchy. 

With the resurgence of Safavid power, the Harfush emirs began to seek an extension of their power to the strategic Machghara, in the southernmost reaches of the Bekaa valley, with a view of securing contact with their fellow Shiites in Jabal Amel. The Ottomans were determined to stop these contacts, taking further steps and appointing Fakhreddine to the sanjak of Sidon in 1590. In 1598, as war broke out again between the Ottomans and Safavids, the Ottomans further appointed Fakhreddine over sanjak of Safed, which gave him direct control over the pro-Safavid Shiites.

Musa Harfush was succeeded by Yunus Harfush, who again re-asserted Harfush control over Homs and the Bekaa. Despite taking part in Ali Janbulad's rebellion, Yunus later emerged as one of the Ottomans' favorite intermediaries, and his influence extended into the decisions of the Sublime Porte and the Janissaries. He also took part in the punitive campaigns against Chouf in 1613–4, and married his son to Fakhreddine's daughter. Yunus' deep rivalries with Fakhreddine eventually culminated in the Battle of Anjar in 1623, which ended with the confirmation of Yunus' other son, Ali, as the Bekaa's multezim. Almost a century later, the Harfushes gave shelter to Haydar Shihab and provided him with 2,500 troops to carry out the Battle of Ain Dara, which resulted in Haydar Shihab's decisive victory. In 1771 and 1781, they also gave refuge to the displaced Shiites from Mount Lebanon and Jabal Amel who were fleeing the brutality of the Shihabis and Ahmad Pasha al-Jazzar.

Jabal Amel

Between 1639–1649, most of Jabal Amel was seized by Ali al-Saghirs after they defeated other rival families, thereby cementing their role as the sole leaders of the region. The pinnacle of Jabal Amel was reached under Nassif al-Nassar (c. 1749–1781) of Ali al-Saghirs during his alliance with Zahir al-Umar. Nassif became Sheikh around 1749 with the blooming of the cotton industry in Jabal Amel, and had built his reputation after repelling several attempts by the Ottoman governors, Shihabis and Zahir al-Umar to seize Jabal Amel. He decisively defeated both the Shihabis in 1750 and Zahir al-Umar in 1767, when the latter attempted to extend his authority to Shiite villages but was defeated in battle and captured, eventually entering into an alliance with Nassif and the Shiites. 

With the new alliance, Zahir's military potential was significantly boosted by the backing of 10,000 Shiite fighters, noted by a French consul as "excellent fighters", who aided him against the sieges and assaults of the governors of Damascus and participated in fifteen subsequent campaigns against his foes. The duo's first decisive battle took place in Lake Huleh in 1771, when the 10,000-strong Ottoman army of Uthman Pasha al-Kurji was virtually annihilated by the duo's forces; about 300-500 Ottoman soldiers survived the battle, and Uthman Pasha returned to Damascus with only 3 of his soldiers.

Through his 10,000-strong cavalry army, Nassif imposed control on all territories between Sidon and Safed and laid siege to Beirut, and had a crucial role in aiding Zahir's campaigns in Palestine and western Transjordan. Nassif and Zahir effectively imposed grande sécurité on the entire region, which best manifested when Ali Bey al-Kabir of Egypt requested Nassif's help to put down the rebellion at Cairo in 1773, or when he was sought by nomadic tribes in the Syro-Jordanian desert for help.

Mount Lebanon 
The Hamadas, originally lieutenants of the Sayfas in Tripoli, spearheaded a rather much smaller Shia community in Mount Lebanon. In the late 17th century, the family controlled a territory that stretched from Safita and Krak des Chevaliers in Syria to Keserwan in the south and Hermel in the east, virtually most of northern Lebanon. Between 1685 and 1700, the Hamadas and their community were in a continuous state of conflict with the Ottomans. In 1686, a joint Hamada-Harfush force defeated and drove the forces of the governors of Sidon and Tripoli out of Keserwan, who had invaded in the region that year. Upon meeting them in 1686, a French diplomat came acquainted with them as the "men of emir Sirhan" and noted their skill in using the musket and welding powder, further describing them as "iron men who would not back out to the strongest of janissaries".

In 1693, the newly-ordained grand vizier Ali Pasha set about organizing a massive new campaign against the Hamadas, committing 20,000 troops to coordinate and annihilate the Shiites and Ahmad Ma'n, who was accused of "supporting the accursed Qizilbash". Entering the conflict as virtually the most powerful taxlord dynasty of the entire Syrian coastlands, the campaign left the Hamadas physically broken.

Political crisis

In the late 18th century, Shiites went through multiple political crises which persisted in their collective memeory until the early 20th century. 
Physiucally weakened, the Hamadas retained some of their tax farms in Mount Lebanon until 1771 when they were defeated and evicted by the northward expanding Shihab dynasty. Following this crisis, a Shiite influx overran the Beqaa. A decade later in 1781, Shia autonomy in Jabal Amel similarly diminished under Ahmad Pasha al-Jazzar (1776–1804), nicknamed the butcher. Al-Jazzar was initially on good terms with Nassif, but their alliance reached a bad point some time in 1781. Afterwards, al-Jazzar defeated and killed Nassif and 470 of his men in battle, proceeding to conquer Shia-held fortress towns and eliminate the Shia sheikhs of Jabal Amel. He then proceeded to send his forces to ransack Shiite libraries rich in valuable manuscripts which were burnt at Acre, where they fed the bakers' ovens, providing them with fuel for several days, and paraded the heads of the fallen in Sidon. 

As a result of his policies, Shiites held a meeting at Chehour village to organise guerrilla attacks against him, which continued throughout his rule. The insurgents managed to temporarily conquer the Tebnine citadel in 1783, and the period witnessed swift uprisings in Tyre and Chehour in 1784–1785. Insurgency continued until the end of al-Jazzar's rule in 1804, and famously involved Faris al-Nassif, Nassif al-Nassar's son.

After al-Jazzar's death he was succeeded by Sulayman Pasha al-Adil in 1805, who signed a treaty with the Shiites in order to end their attacks. The treaty was signed at Beit ed-Dine as a result of the mediation of Bashir Shihab II (1788-1840) between the two sides. The agreement restored their autonomy and granted a general amnesty for all Shia rebels previously active against al-Jazzar and his forces, as well as a compensation for their losses after the battle of Yaroun, and granted the community the right to solve their internal problems without interference from the Ottoman governor.

Egyptian occupation
When Muhammad Ali Pasha of Egypt invaded the Levant in 1833, he received the support of the Shihabis, which unfuriated the Shiites and Druze. Resenting the Shihabi-Egyptian alliance, Shiites assumed a central role in the efforts of expelling the Egyptians from Syria. Khanjar Harfush of Baalbek and his forces engaged an Egyptian army of 12,000 in Nabek and Keserwan, while further south, Hamad al-Mahmoud of Jabal Amel single-handedly drove out the Egyptians as far as Safed in northern Palestine after a decisive battle at Rmaich. Following Egyptian defeat in 1840, the Ottomans deposed the Shihab dynasty and rewarded al-Mahmoud by restoring Jabal Amel's autonomy until 1865, when it was incorporated into Syria vilayet and came under direct Ottoman rule.

1860 Civil war
Following the outbreak of the 1860 civil war, the conflict in Mount Lebanon had affected neighbouring areas. In the Bekaa valley, the Shiites joined the Druze in ravaging Zahle and Baalbek after being alienated by the Zahalni (townsfolk of Zahle). In Jabal Amel the situation was more sporadic and less intense, with Shiites allied with Druzes against Christian villagers, or acting on their own. At some times, the Shiites also fought the Druze, who at Jbaa attacked and wounded their religious chief who was sheltering a Christian refugee, and proceeded to loot his home. Many Christian refugees were reportedly given protection by the Shiites in Chyah and Jabal Amel, where they settled in a plethora of villages including Rmaich and Tebnine. 

After violence subsided, Mehmed Fuad Pasha appointed the Shiite leader Ali al-As'ad to a commission to investigate the causes of the civil war, and put him in charge of maintaining order in eastern Lebanon, around Damascus and in Hauran. Following Ali al-As'ad's death in 1865, the Ottomans abolished the Sidon eyalet and incorporated Jabal Amel to Syria, effectively bringing Shiites under direct control of the Ottomans.

Relations with Safavid Iran
When the Safavids began converting Iran to Shiism by coercion and persuasion, they compensated the lack of established Shia fiqh in Iran by asking Shia clergies from Jabal Amel, Bahrain and Al-Ahsa to immigrate to Iran. Chief among them was Muhaqqiq al-Karaki, from Karak Nuh in the Bekaa valley, who achieved limitless power during the reign of Shah Tahmasp I such that the Shah told him, “You are the real king and I am just one of your agents". These contacts greatly angered the Ottomans. In addition to their different narrative of Islam, the Ottomans suspected Shias of being a stalking horse for the Safavids, and often derogatorily referred to them as Qizilbash. Thus, the Shia oppression in Lebanon was a marriage of politics and religion.

French mandate period

When the French entered Nabatieh in 1918, they barred the local populace from carrying out political activity. As a response, Sadiq Hamzeh hoisted the Arab flag in several villages as a symbol of rejecting French occupation. Following the Syrian National Congress in 2 July 1919, when Shiites restated their support for Syrian unity, Maronites increased their armed activities against the Shiites. The French supported several Maronite militia, especially those in Qlaiaa and Kfour by Nabatieh. Furthermore, Maronite newspapers had negatively depicted the Shiite groups, often as murderers and pillagers. 

Following the official declaration of the French Mandate of Greater Lebanon (Le Grand Liban) in September 1920, anti-French riots broke out in the predominantly Shia areas of Jabal Amil and the Beqaa Valley. In between 1920 and 1921, rebels from these areas attacked French military bases in Southern Lebanon and the Beqaa valley. In one confrontation, Sadiq Hamzeh and his men killed and wounded around fifty French soldiers, and took their weapons. During this period of chaos, also several predominantly Christian villages in the region were attacked due to the armed support they received from the French and their perceived acceptance of French mandatory rule, including Ain Ebel. This was the perfect moment for the French to strike, as they sent to the south an expedition of 4,000–6,000 soldiers lead by Colonel Niger, heavily bombing the villages and crushing the Shiite rebellion by June 1920. Resistance subsided following the French campaign, and Adham Khanjar and his men continued their sabotage missions until an unsuccessful assassination attempt on French High Commissioner Henri Gouraud, which led to Khanjar's execution in 1923.

Shia cleric Abdul Husayn Sharafeddine had organized and lead the nonviolent resistance movement against the French since 1919, and demanded US support for Syrian unity during the King–Crane Commission visit. This angered the French, who encouraged an unsuccessful assassination attempt against him. Sharafeddine understood that sectarian hostility only gave purpose for French military presence in the area, and thus called for the protection of the Christians in the conference of Wadi al-Hujayr on 24 April 1920.The Christians (Nasara) are your brethren in the country and in destiny. Show to them the love you show to yourselves. Protect their lives and possessions as you do to your own. Only by this can you face the conspiracy and put an end to the civil strife.

Later in 1921, this period of unrest ended with a political amnesty offered by the French mandate authorities for all Shiites who had joined the riots, with the intention to bind the Shia community in the South of Lebanon to the new Mandate state. However, the French breakdown on Shiites left the latter resentful against them. The French had dispersed the Shiite leaders and thousands of peasants who feared reprisals, and the high fines imposed on them caused financial misery. When the Great Syrian Revolt broke out in 1925, rebellion once again broke out but this time it was ineffective. Many Southerners went to Syria to participate, whereas in the Beqaa Valley battle spread to the Qalamoun Mountains and Akroum, where according to eye-witness accounts Shiites took more than 400 rifles and fifty horses as booty from French forces.
Many Christians who fled their villages during the revolt were accommodated by Shia notables from Nabatieh and Bint Jbeil, an act that was appreciated by Christian clergies in letters.
... what the Shi'ites did for the Christians in the south will be cherished in our hearts for as long as Lebanon and the Christians remain. What happened should be written in gold. Long live Lebanon, Long live Lebanese unity and long live the Shiites.
After the revolt, the region experienced a decade or so of political stability. The Shiites gradually grew more accepting of Greater Lebanon due to various sectarian and non-sectarian reasons. The Shiite zu'ama also believed their fortune would best be achieved within the newly founded Lebanese state.

During the 1936–1939 Arab revolt in Palestine, Southerners had a key role in providing ammunition and assistance to the Palestinian rebels, and the revolt was in fact co-administered from Bint Jbeil. During the revolt in 1938, the French requested British Royal Air Force support during their operations against insurgents in Bint Jbeil and South. In addition, Abdul-Husayn Sharafeddine expressed solidarity with the Palestinian strike and demand for independence.

Education

In the 19th century, Lebanon saw dramatic changes when missionaries started establishing schools throughout the country. While the French and Russians mainly encouraged Maronite and Orthodox active learning respectively, along with American Protestant missions in Beirut, the British established educational institutions in Druze areas, and Sunnis mainly benefitted from Ottoman state institutions. However, Shiites were the only ones who did not benefit from such activities. This neglectance continued into the early days of the French mandate.

During the 1920s and 1930s, educational institutions became places for different religious communities to construct nationalist and sectarian modes of identification. Shia leaders and religious clergy supported educational reforms in order to improve the social and political marginalization of the Shia community and increase their involvement in the newly born nation-state of Lebanon. This led to the establishment of several private Shia schools in Lebanon, among them The Charitable Islamic ʿĀmili Society (al-Jamʿiyya al-Khayriyya al-Islāmiyya al-ʿĀmiliyya) in Beirut and The Charitable Jaʿfari Society (al-Jamʿiyya al-Khayriyya al-Jaʿfariyya) in Tyre. While several Shia educational institutions were established before and at the beginning of the mandate period, they often ran out of support and funding which resulted in their abolishment.

The primary outlet for discussions concerning educational reforms among Shia scholars was the monthly Shiite journal al-'Irfan, founded in 1909. In order to bring their demands (muṭālabiyya) to the attention of the French authorities, petitions were signed and presented to the French High Commissioner and the Service de l'Instruction Publique. This institution – since 1920 headquartered in Beirut- oversaw every educational policy regarding public and private school in the mandate territories. According to historian Elizabeth Thompson, private schools were part of "constant negotiations" between citizen and the French authorities in Lebanon, specifically regarding the hierarchical distribution of social capital along religious communal lines. During these negotiations, petitions were often used by different sects to demand support for reforms. For example, the middle-class of predominantly urban Sunni areas expressed their demands for educational reforms through petitions directed towards the French High Commissioner and the League of Nations.

Sayyid Abdul-Husayn Sharafeddine believed that the only way to ward off foreign political influence was to establish modern schools while maintaining Islamic teachings. In 1938, he built two schools, one for girls and another for boys, at his own expense. However, the girls' school did not last long due to financial difficulties and traditional views, prompting Sayyid Sharafeddine to transfer the girls and teach them in his own home. The boys' school was known as al-Ja'fariyya, and was able to continue despite financial difficulties.

Ja'fari shar'ia courts

In January 1926, the French High Commissioner officially recognized the Shia community as an "independent religious community," which was permitted to judge matters of personal status "according to the principles of the rite known by the name of Ja'fari." This meant that the Shiite Ja'fari jurisprudence or madhhab was legally recognized as an official madhhab, and held judicial and political power on multiple levels. The institutionalization of Shia Islam during this period provoked discussions between Shiite scholars and clergy about how Shiite orthodoxy should be defined. For example, discussions about the mourning of the martyrdom of Imam Husain during Ashura, which was a clandestine affair before the 1920s and 1930s, led to its transformation into a public ceremony.

On the other hand, the official recognition of legal and religious Shiite institutions by the French authorities strengthened a sectarian awareness within the Shia community. Historian Max Weiss underlines how "sectarian claims were increasingly bound up with the institutionalization of Shi'i difference." With the Ja'fari shar'ia courts in practice, the Shia community was deliberately encouraged to "practice sectarianism" on a daily basis.

Sub-groups

Shia Twelvers (Metouali)

Shia Twelvers in Lebanon refers to the Shia Muslim Twelver community with a significant presence all over Lebanon including the Mount Lebanon (Keserwan, Byblos), the North (Batroun), the South, the Beqaa, Baabda District coastal areas and Beirut.

The jurisdiction of the Ottoman Empire was merely nominal in the Lebanon. Baalbek in the 18th century was really under the control of the Metawali, which also refers to the Shia Twelvers. Metawali, Metouali, or Mutawili, is an archaic term used to specifically refer to Lebanese Twelver Shias in the past. Although it can be considered offensive nowadays, it was a way to distinguish the uniqueness and unity of the community. The term 'mutawili' is also the name of a trustee in Islamic waqf-system.

Seven Shia Twelver (Mutawili) villages that were reassigned from French Greater Lebanon to the British Mandate of Palestine in a 1924 border-redrawing agreement were depopulated during the 1948 Arab-Israeli War and repopulated with Jews. The seven villages are Qadas, Nabi Yusha, al-Malikiyya, Hunin, Tarbikha, Abil al-Qamh, and Saliha.

In addition, the Shia Twelvers in Lebanon have close links to the Syrian Shia Twelvers.

Alawites

There are an estimated 100,000 Alawites in Lebanon, where they have lived since at least the 16th century. They are recognized as one of the 18 official Lebanese sects, and due to the efforts of an Alawite leader Ali Eid, the Taif Agreement of 1989 gave them two reserved seats in the Parliament. Lebanese Alawites live mostly in the Jabal Mohsen neighbourhood of Tripoli, and in 10 villages in the Akkar region, and are mainly represented by the Arab Democratic Party. Bab al-Tabbaneh, Jabal Mohsen clashes between pro-Syrian Alawites and anti-Syrian Sunnis have haunted Tripoli for decades.

Isma'ilis
Isma'ilism, or "Sevener Shi'ism", is a branch of Shia Islam which emerged in 765 from a disagreement over the succession to Muhammad. Isma'ilis hold that Isma'il ibn Jafar was the true seventh imam, and not Musa al-Kadhim as the Twelvers believe. Isma'ili Shi'ism also differs doctrinally from Imami Shi'ism, having beliefs and practices that are more esoteric and maintaining seven pillars of faith rather than five pillars and ten ancillary precepts.

Though perhaps somewhat better established in neighbouring Syria, where the faith founded one of its first da'wah outposts in the city of Salamiyah (the supposed resting place of the Imam Isma'il) in the 8th century, it has been present in what is now Lebanon for centuries. Early Lebanese Isma'ilism showed perhaps an unusual propensity to foster radical movements within it, particularly in the areas of Wadi al-Taym, adjoining the Beqaa valley at the foot of Mount Hermon, and Jabal Shuf, in the highlands of Mount Lebanon.

The syncretic beliefs of the Qarmatians, typically classed as an Isma'ili splinter sect with Zoroastrian influences, spread into the area of the Beqaa valley and possibly also Jabal Shuf starting in the 9th century. The group soon became widely vilified in the Islamic world for its armed campaigns across throughout the following decades, which included slaughtering Muslim pilgrims and sacking Mecca and Medina—and Salamiyah. Other Muslim rulers soon acted to crush this powerful heretical movement. In the Levant, the Qarmatians were ordered to be stamped out by the ruling Fatimid, themselves Isma'ilis and from whom the lineage of the modern Nizari Aga Khan is claimed to descend. The Qarmatian movement in the Levant was largely extinguished by the turn of the millennium.

The semi-divine personality of the Fatimid caliph in Isma'ilism was elevated further in the doctrines of a secretive group which began to venerate the caliph Hakim as the embodiment of divine unity. Unsuccessful in the imperial capital of Cairo, they began discreetly proselytising around the year 1017 among certain Arab tribes in the Levant. The Isma'ilis of Wadi al-Taym and Jabal Shuf were among those who converted before the movement was permanently closed off a few decades later to guard against outside prying by mainstream Sunni and Shia Muslims, who often viewed their doctrines as heresy. This deeply esoteric group became known as the Druze, who in belief, practice, and history have long since become distinct from Isma'ilis proper. Druze constitute 5.2% of the modern population of Lebanon and still have a strong demographic presence in their traditional regions within the country to this day.

Due to official persecution by the Sunni Zengid dynasty that stoked escalating sectarian clashes with Sunnis, many Isma'ilis in the regions of Damascus and Aleppo are said to have fled west during the 12th century. Some settled in the mountains of Lebanon, while others settled further north along the coastal ridges in Syria, where the Alawites had earlier taken refuge—and where their brethren in the Assassins were cultivating a fearsome reputation as they staved off armies of Crusaders and Sunnis alike for many years.

Once far more numerous and widespread in many areas now part of Lebanon, the Isma'ili population has largely vanished over time. It has been suggested that Ottoman-era persecution might have spurred them to leave for elsewhere in the region, though there is no record or evidence of any kind of large exodus.

Isma'ilis were originally included as one of five officially-defined Muslim sects in a 1936 edict issued by the French Mandate governing religious affairs in the territory of Greater Lebanon, alongside Sunnis, Twelver Shias, Alawites, and Druzes. However, Muslims collectively rejected being classified as divided, and so were left out of the law in the end. Ignored in a post-independence law passed in 1951 that defined only Judaism and Christian sects as official, Muslims continued under traditional Ottoman law, within the confines of which small communities like Isma'ilis and Alawites found it difficult to establish their own institutions.

The Aga Khan IV made a brief stop in Beirut on 4 August 1957 while on a global tour of Nizari Isma'ili centres, drawing an estimated 600 Syrian and Lebanese followers of the religion to the Beirut Airport in order to welcome him. In the mid-1980s, several hundred Isma'ilis were thought to still live in a few communities scattered across several parts of Lebanon. Though they are nominally counted among the 18 officially-recognised sects under modern Lebanese law, they currently have no representation in state functions and continue to lack personal status laws for their sect, which has led to increased conversions to established sects to avoid the perpetual inconveniences this produces.

War in the region has also caused pressures on Lebanese Isma'ilis. In the 2006 Lebanon War, Israeli warplanes bombed the factory of the Maliban Glass company in the Beqaa valley on 19 July. The factory was bought in the late 1960s by the Madhvani Group under the direction of Isma'ili entrepreneur Abdel-Hamid al-Fil after the Aga Khan personally brought the two into contact. It had expanded over the next few decades from an ailing relic to the largest glass manufacturer in the Levant, with 300 locally hired workers producing around 220,000 tons of glass per day. Al-Fil closed the plant down on 15 July just after the war broke out to safeguard against the deaths of workers in the event of such an attack, but the damage was estimated at a steep 55 million US dollars, with the reconstruction timeframe indefinite due to instability and government hesitation.

Geographic distribution within Lebanon
Lebanese Shia Muslims are concentrated in south Beirut and its southern suburbs, northern and western area of the Beqaa Valley, as well as Southern Lebanon.

Demographics

Note that the following percentages are estimates only. However, in a country that had last census in 1932, it is difficult to have correct population estimates.

The last census in Lebanon in 1932 put the numbers of Shias at 19.6% of the population (154,208 of 785,543). A study done by the Central Intelligence Agency (CIA) in 1985 put the numbers of Shias at 41% of the population (919,000 of 2,228,000). A study done by the French Institute for Demographic Studies – Paris in 2005 estimated Shias at about 34% of Lebanon's population. In contrast, a 2012 CIA study reports that the Shia Muslims constituted an estimated 27% of Lebanon's population. More recently, the CIA World Factbook estimated that Shia Muslims constitute 31.2% of Lebanon's population in 2022.

Based on Ottoman tapu tahrir tax registers between 1519 and 1545, Shiite males counted roughly 16,462 males out of a total of 42,791 males living in present-day Lebanon, or 38.5% of the total male population.
During the post-independence decades between 1943 and 1990, Shiites had the highest fertility rate (3.8) of all communities. Starting in 1921 from a mere 17.2% (104,947 of 609,069), the population almost doubled to 32% by 1988 (1,325,000 of 4,044,784), with a total increase of around 1,200%, the highest of any major community.

Genetics

In a 2020 study published in the American Journal of Human Genetics, authors showed that there is substantial genetic continuity in Lebanon and the Levant since the Bronze Age (3300–1200 BC) interrupted by three significant admixture events during the Iron Age, Hellenistic, and Ottoman period, each contributing 3%–11% of non-local ancestry to the admixed population. The admixtures were tied to the Sea Peoples of the Late Bronze Age collapse, Central/South Asians and Ottoman Turks respectively. Genetic studies have shown that there are no significant genetic differences between Lebanese Muslims and non-Muslims.

Haplogroup J2 is also a significant marker throughout Lebanon (29%). This marker found in many inhabitants of Lebanon, regardless of religion, signals pre-Arab descendants, although not exclusively. Genealogical DNA testing has shown that 21.3% of Lebanese Muslims (non-Druze) belong to the Y-DNA haplogroup J1 compared with non-Muslims at 17%. Although Haplogroup J1 is most common in Arabian peninsula, studies have shown that it has been present in the Levant since the Bronze Age and does not necessarily indicate Arabian descent. Other haplogroups present among Lebanese Shia include E1b1b (17%), G-M201 (10%), R1b, and T-L206 occurring at smaller, but significant rates.

Notable Lebanese Shia Muslims

Muhammad Jamaluddin al-Makki al-ʿĀmili (1334–1385) – Prominent Shia scholar from Jezzine, known as "Shahid Awwal"/"First Martyr"
Nur-al-Din al-Karaki al-ʿĀmilī (1465–1534) – Shiite scholar and a member of the Safavid court
Bahāʾ al-dīn al-ʿĀmilī (1547–1621) – Shia Islamic scholar, philosopher, architect, and polymath
Al-Hurr al-Amili (1624–1693) – prominent Shia muhaddith and compiler of Wasa'il al-Shia
Nassif al-Nassar (c. 1750–1781) – Sheikh of Jabal Amel
Abdel Hussein Charafeddine – Spiritual leader and social reformer, leading supporter of unity within a Greater Syria and organiser of nonviolent resistance against the French, and the founder of the modern city of Tyre
Musa al-Sadr – Spiritual leader and founder of the Amal movement, philosopher and Shi'a religious leader
Hussein el Husseini – Statesman, co-founder of the Amal movement and Speaker of Parliament
Mohammad Hussein Fadlallah – Spiritual Leader and Shia Grand Ayatollah, former spiritual guide of Islamic Dawa Party in Lebanon
Hassan Nasrallah – Leader of the group Hezbollah
Imad Mughniyah – Lebanese, Hezbollah's former Chief of Staff
Mustafa Badreddine – Military leader in Hezbollah and both the cousin and brother-in-law of Imad Mughniyah
Adel Osseiran – Speaker of the Lebanese Parliament, and one of the founding fathers of the Lebanese Republic
Sabri Hamade – Speaker of the Parliament and political leader
Ahmed al-Asaad – Speaker of the parliament and political leader
Kamel Asaad – Speaker of the parliament and political leader
Nabih Berri – Speaker of the Parliament and political leader of Amal Movement
Abbas Ibrahim –  General director of the General Directorate of General Security
Wafiq Jizzini –  Former General director of the General Directorate of General Security
Jamil Al Sayyed – Former General director of the General Directorate of General Security
Adham Khanjar – Lebanese revolutionary who attempted to assassinate Henri Gouraud and as a result was executed in 1923
Tawfiq Hawlo Haidar – Lebanese revolutionary who took part in the Great Syrian Revolt (1925–1927)
Hussein al-Musawi – Founder of Islamic Amal militia in 1982
Assem Qanso –  Former leader of the Lebanese Arab Socialist Baath Party
Ali Qanso – Member of cabinet, former president of the Syrian Social Nationalist Party
Husayn Muruwwa – Marxist philosopher and former key member of the Lebanese Communist Party
Mahdi Amel – Marxist philosopher and former prominent member of the Lebanese Communist party
Muhsin Ibrahim – Communist, founder and former leader of the Communist Action Organization in Lebanon
Ahmad Rida – Shiite scholar and linguist, compiled the first monolingual Arabic dictionary, Matn al-Lugha
Muhammad Jaber Al Safa – Historian, writer and Arab nationalist
Ahmed Aref El-Zein – Reformist scholar, Arab nationalist and founder of Al-Irfan magazine in 1909
Hassan Kamel Al-Sabbah – Electrical engineer, mathematician and inventor with patents in television transmission.
Rammal Rammal – Lebanese Physicist
Ali Chamseddine – Lebanese Physicist
Zaynab Fawwaz – Pioneering novelist, playwright, poet and historian of famous women in the 19th century
Hanan al-Shaykh – Lebanese author
Amal Saad-Ghorayeb – Lebanese writer and scholar
Malek Maktabi – Lebanese journalist and television presenter, husband of Nayla Tueni
Fouad Ajami – Former university professor at Stanford University and writer on Middle Eastern issues
Haifa Wehbe – Singer and actress
Layal Abboud – Singer
Rima Fakih – winner of the 2010 Miss USA title; later converted from Shia Islam to Maronite Christianity
Mouhamed Harfouch – Brazilian-Lebanese actor
Ragheb Alama – Singer, composer, television personality, and philanthropist
Assi El Helani – Famous singer
May Hariri – Model, actress, and singer
Alissar Caracalla – Lebanese Dance choreographer
Hassan Bechara – Lebanese wrestler, won the bronze medal in the men's Greco-Roman Super Heavyweight category
Roda Antar – Lebanese football manager, Former captain of Lebanese national team and player who currently coaches Racing Beirut in the Lebanese Football League.
Moussa Hojeij – Lebanese football player and manager at Nejmeh SC

See also
 Religion in Lebanon
 Islam in Lebanon
 Lebanese Sunni Muslims
 Lebanese Druze
 Banu Amela, Shia tribe in Lebanon
 Jabal Amel, region in Lebanon
 Lebanese Maronite Christians
 Lebanese Melkite Christians
 Lebanese Greek Orthodox Christians
 Lebanese Protestant Christians

References

External links

 The Shia Rulers of Banu Ammar, Banu Mardas and the Mazidi